Kentro Neon Onisillos Sotiras was a Cypriot football club from the village of Sotira. The club was founded in 1978 and was named after the ancient Cypriot revolutionary Onesilus. The club has played in the Cypriot First Division once during the 2003–04 season. The club was dissolved on 16 July 2014 due to financial problems.

Notable players 
  Panayiotis Kosma
  Robin Muller van Moppes
  Tom Kalkhuis
  Martijn Roosenburg
  Paulinho
  Sebastião Nogueira
  Peter Kostolani
  Demetris Christofi
  Takis Pattadorou
  Leuteris Eleutheriou

External links

References

 
Defunct football clubs in Cyprus
Association football clubs established in 1978
1978 establishments in Cyprus